An incomplete list of films produced in Brazil in the 1990s. For an A-Z list of films currently on Wikipedia see :Category:Brazilian films.

1990

1991

1992

1993

1994

1995

1996

1997

1998

1999

External links
 Brazilian film at the Internet Movie Database

1990s
Lists of 1990s films
Films